The Forest County Potawatomi Community is a federally recognized tribe of Potawatomi people with approximately 1,400 members as of 2010. The community is based on the Forest County Potawatomi Indian Reservation, which consists of numerous non-contiguous plots of land in southern Forest County and northern Oconto County,  Wisconsin, United States. The combined population of Forest County Potawatomi Community and Off-Reservation Trust Land was 594 in the 2020 census. The nation's administrative and cultural center are located about three miles east of Crandon, Wisconsin.

Tribal ventures

Casinos
The Forest County Potawatomi run the Potawatomi Hotel & Casino in Milwaukee and the Potawatomi Bingo Northern Lights Casino in Carter, Wisconsin.

Crandon Mine
Along with the Sokaogon Chippewa Community, the Potawatomi bought the nearby Crandon mine in Crandon to prevent its reopening.  The tribes argued the reopening of the zinc and copper mine would harm the environment.

Forest County Potawatomi Cultural Center and Museum
The Forest County Potawatomi Cultural Center and Museum were created to educate the public and pass the culture and traditions of the Potawatomi people to the next generations. The Cultural Center is a new way of gathering the people — to share stories and to learn from one another. The Forest County Potawatomi Community welcomes Native Americans and non-Native Americans alike to learn about the community and their contributions. With input from community elders and internationally-known museum designers, many unique, informative and entertaining exhibits were constructed and are now captivating general public visitors. The  permanent exhibit, which is bilingual (Potawatomi and English), is divided into four main sections: a history of the Potawatomi, entitled The Long Walk; an interactive kiosk, entitled People Who Share a Language; a display of different traditional elements, entitled Traditional Ways; and a display of the heritage of the present day tribe. Other highlights of the exhibit include: "People of the Three Fires" main diorama-recreation of the Council of Three Fires is located in the center of the exhibition. "The Gathering": video presentation of the various Potawatomi communities across North America. "The Wall of Treaties"—reproductions of 43 United States and seven Canadian treaties conducted with the Potawatomi.  "Wigwas Tthiman" (Birchbark Canoe)—this birchbark canoe was constructed on site at the Potawatomi Cultural Center and Museum using traditional methods as a living display. The canoe project took five weeks to complete and visitors were able to watch each step of the process.  "Living History/Craft Classes"—Community instructional classes such as: moccasin, flute, dance regalia, scale model canoe building, language classes, birch/quill and black ash basketry are offered throughout the year.

See also
Black Earth, Wisconsin (Potawatomi village)

Notes

References
Forest County Potawatomi Community and Off-Reservation Trust Land, Wisconsin United States Census Bureau

External links
Forest County Potawatomi
Potawatomi Museum
Profile from the State of Wisconsin
Potawatomi Bingo Casino, run by the Forest County Potawatomi
Potawatomi Bingo Northern Lights Casino, run by the Forest County Potawatomi
Crandon Mine Reports from the University of Wisconsin Digital Collections Center
"FCP Museum and Cultural Center to Expand" in Potawatomi Traveling Times, September 15, 2006. Page 9.
"FCP Museum News: On the Lake Geneva/Chief Big Foot Issue" in Potawatomi Traveling Times, August 1, 2006. Page 9.

Native American tribes in Wisconsin
Potawatomi
Anishinaabe reservations and tribal-areas in the United States
Populated places in Forest County, Wisconsin
Geography of Milwaukee
Populated places in Oconto County, Wisconsin
Federally recognized tribes in the United States